80 Plus (trademarked 80 PLUS) is a voluntary certification program launched in 2004, intended to promote efficient energy use in computer power supply units (PSUs).

Certification is acquirable for products that have more than 80% energy efficiency at 20%, 50% and 100% of rated load, and a power factor of 0.9 or greater at 100% load.

History
 EPRI (Electric Power Research) and Ecos Consulting (promoter of the brand) develop the Generalized Internal Power Supply Efficiency Test Protocol for desktop derived multi-output power supplies.
 March 2004: the 80 Plus idea was presented as an initiative at the ACEEE Market Transformation Symposium.
 February 2005: the first market-ready power supply was created by Seasonic.
 2006: Energy Star added 80 Plus requirements to their then-upcoming (in effect since July 2007) Energy Star 4.0 computer specifications.
 November and February 2006: HP and Dell certify their PSUs to the 80 Plus specification.
 20 July 2007: Energy Star Computer Specification 4.0 goes into effect. The specification includes 80 Plus power supply efficiency levels for desktop computers.
 December 2007: over 200 PSUs on the market are 80 Plus certified and it is becoming the market standard.
 First-quarter 2008: standards revised to add Bronze, Silver, and Gold higher efficiency level certifications.
 October 2009: added specification for the Platinum efficiency level.
 February 2012: Dell and Delta Electronics working together were able to achieve world-first 80 Plus Titanium server power supply.

Efficiency level certifications

4 categories for the certification:
 115 V lists power supplies certified for desktop, workstation, and non-redundant server applications.
 230 V lists power supplies certified for redundant, data center applications.
 115 V Industrial lists power supplies for industrial applications. Units may be any physical format (embedded, encapsulated, open frame, rack mount, DIN-mount).
 230 V EU Internal power supplies are certified for desktop, workstation, and server applications in non-redundant configurations.

For the higher certification levels, the requirement of 0.9 or better power factor was extended to apply to 20% and 50% load levels, as well as at 100% load. The Platinum level requires 0.95 or better power factor for servers.

The Climate Savers Computing Initiative efficiency level targets for workstations for 2007 through 2011, corresponding to the 80 Plus certification levels. From July 2007 through June 2008, the basic 80 Plus level (Energy Star 4.0). For the next year, the target is 80 Plus Bronze level, the following year 80 Plus Silver, then 80 Plus Gold, and finally Platinum.

Redundancy is typically used in data centers.

Misleading power supply advertising
There have been instances where companies claim or imply that their supplies are 80 Plus when they have not been certified, and in some cases do not meet the requirements. When a company resells an OEM power supply under a new name it must be certified under the new name and company, even if the OEM supply is certified. In some instances, a reseller has claimed a higher wattage than the supply can deliver – in which case, the reseller's supply would not meet 80 Plus requirements. The 80 Plus website has a list of all certified supplies, so it is possible to confirm that supply meets the requirements.

Although some power supply manufacturers name their products with similar names, such as "85 Plus", "90 Plus" and "95 Plus" there is no such official certification or standard.

Verify certification

Other than misleading consumers by falsely claiming certification with similar names or companies "reselling", another way companies try to confuse consumers is by claiming they meet a certain certification requirement when in fact they do not. For example, the highest 80 Plus is 80+ Titanium (96% efficiency at 50% load). Some companies will claim they meet this requirement even when they are only close (i.e. 95.xx%) therefore claiming 80+ Titanium. However, this is not the case as one could easily modify the test unit to be more enhanced than production models in order to slightly raise numbers.

The Plug Load Solutions official website provides lists certifications for each company, allowing consumers to verify how many and which models are listed. For example, if we take a look at the highest rating available (80 Plus Titanium) in the 230V Internal category (most common for industrial PSUs) for comparison; we can see that Compuware Corporation leads with 29 models, followed by Super Micro Computer, Inc. with 20 80 Plus Titanium units, and close third place is Delta Electronics with 18 units.

Technical overview

The efficiency of a computer power supply is its output power divided by its input power; the remaining input power is converted into heat. For instance, a 600-watt power supply with 60% efficiency running at full load would draw 1000 W from the mains and would therefore waste 400 W as heat. On the other hand, a 600-watt power supply with 80% efficiency running at full load would draw 750 W from the mains and would therefore waste only 150 W as heat.

For a given power supply, efficiency varies depending on how much power is being delivered. Supplies are typically most efficient at between half and three-quarters load, much less efficient at low load, and somewhat less efficient at maximum load. Older ATX power supplies were typically 60% to 75% efficient. To qualify for 80 Plus, a power supply must achieve at least 80% efficiency at three specified loads (20%, 50% and 100% of maximum rated power). However, 80 Plus supplies may still be less than 80% efficient at lower loads. For instance, an 80 Plus, 520 watt supply could still be 70% or less efficient at 60 watts (a typical idle power for a desktop computer). Thus it is still important to select a supply with capacity appropriate to the device being powered.

It is easier to achieve the higher efficiency levels for higher wattage supplies, so gold and platinum supplies may be less available in consumer-level supplies of reasonable capacity for typical desktop machines.

Typical computer power supplies may have power factors as low as 0.5 to 0.6. The higher power factor reduces the peak current draw, reducing load on the circuit or on an uninterruptible power supply.

Reducing the heat output of the computer helps reduce noise, since fans do not have to spin as fast to cool the computer. Reduced heat and resulting in lower cooling demands may increase computer reliability.

The testing conditions may give an unrealistic expectation of efficiency for heavily loaded, high power (rated much larger than 300 W) supplies. A heavily loaded power supply and the computer it is powering generate significant amounts of heat, which may raise the power supply temperature, which is likely to decrease its efficiency. Since power supplies are certified at room temperature, this effect is not taken into account.

80 Plus does not set efficiency targets for very low load. For instance, generation of standby power may still be relatively inefficient, and may not meet requirements of the One Watt Initiative. Testing of 80 Plus power supplies shows that they vary considerably in standby efficiency. Some power supplies consume half a watt or less in standby with no load, where others consume several times as much at standby, even though they may meet higher 80 Plus certification requirement levels.

See also
 AC adapter
 Green computing
 IT energy management
 Power management
 Performance per watt
 Quiet PC

References

External links
 
 .

Computer hardware standards
Computers and the environment
Power supplies
Energy conservation